Natania (born October 29, 1992) is an Indian pop musician and singer-songwriter based in Los Angeles, California.

Early life
Natania is an Indian of Sindhi origin and was born and raised in Mumbai. She went to Cathedral and John Connon school. She finished her education at Jai Hind College, Mumbai. She was part of The Stop Gaps Choral Ensemble that is considered to be one of India's most prestigious choirs. In 2010, she attended The Berklee School of Music's Summer Program in Boston. She then moved to Los Angeles and attended Musician's Institute in Hollywood, California.

Career

2012 – 2017 
Natania began recording her debut EP, Hope and Heartbreak while she was in College. Lalwani wrote and performed all songs on the record. She co-produced the record with Max Mitchell, an LA-based record producer and keyboardist. The single Cherry Love was inspired by a T-shirt Lalwani saw at a H&M in New York City. The single was released with an animated-lyric video which received over 30,000 views on YouTube in just a few days. The video then proceeded to air on VH1 India along major label artists like Taylor Swift, One Direction creating a buzz for Lalwani. The EP led to her signing with Urband & Lazaar, a music licensing company in Los Angeles that secured her songs spots on American Television. She then was featured on Music Connection's prestigious "HOT 100 Unsigned Artists" list, which in the past has featured artists like Sara Bareilles and the band, Steel Panther. Hope and Heartbreak was listed in the Top 25 Music Critiques in 2013. Cherry Love also won "Honorable Mention" at the Unsigned Only International Songwriting Competition. Lalwani was part of the top finalists out of 8,000 entries from over 100 countries. Songs from the EP have been featured in commercials for the fashion brand PS I Made This.
After her EP she released her single "The Letter". It earned Natania her first GIMA nomination
She continued releasing singles like "Box You Up","Prisoner", "Enough" independently getting her recognition on VH1 on It got Time Out Mumbai and Hindustan Times Brunch, Deccan Herald Tadpoles and Miss Malini, (who called Lalwani India's Taylor Swift). Her song charted at no. 35 on VH1's Top 50 videos of 2014 The success of the singles led to Lalwani being an official judge at India's biggest college festivals like Malhar, Kaleidoscope and IIT's Mood Indigo.
Natania was chosen out of hundreds of songwriters in America, and was invited to work with Desmond Child at his studio in Nashville in 2016.
These singles were featured on X Factor Australia, Skin Wars, ESPN, Late Night with Seth Meyers, Esquire Network, Celebrity Big Brother, A Current Affair, Teen Mom, Are You The One?, Better Homes And Gardens, Rio 2016 Paraylmpics

2018–present 
Natania released her single "Mess Me Up" on Lowly Palace and Chill Nation that created buzz. It was featured in multiple commercials and apps. She then released her single "Yellow Lights" that was featured on multiple playlists on Spotify and Saavn and earned her the first female cover of the Official Spotify playlist "No Borders". It has received over 1.5 Million streams. It premiered on Rolling Stone and received airplay on Radio One all across India. Since Natania has released Kissing Mouths (collaboration with Not Famous), Feelings (Collaboration with Deep Chills) and Muscle Memory

Collaborations 
Natania co-wrote and is the voice of the official Spotify India Launch Ad. She also lent her voice for brands like Nykaa, the Lipton Ad Campaign of 2018 and Lenskart for Katrina Kaif. She co-wrote the theme song for the Amazon Show "Four More Shots Please" and wrote and sang multiple songs for the soundtrack. Natania co-wrote Akasa's Thug Ranjha that released under Sony Music earning 30 Million streams within the first month. She co-wrote "When I Was Young" by Neo Noir that peaked at #3 on the Spotify US and Global Viral charts. Natania penned Music for the official trailer for "Heart Of Man" that went to #1 on iTunes. Her songs have placed in TV Shows such as the"X Factor", "Late Night With Seth Meyers", “Younger”, GMA, "Teen Mom” and “So You Think You Can Dance”. Her music has been featured on VH1, Radio One, Rolling Stone, Vogue etc. Natania has also been nominated for the prestigious GIMA award and was the winner of MTV's Project Aloft Star.

Awards
Natania was nominated for a Global Indian Music Academy Award in 2015 for "Best Independent Song"

Lalwani is the season one winner of MTV'S Project Aloft Star India
 
Radio City Freedom Awards
2014: Best Pop Artist (People's Choice) 
2014: Best Pop Artist 
2014: Best New Artist

References

1992 births
American women singer-songwriters
Living people
Singers from Mumbai
Singers from Los Angeles
21st-century American singers
21st-century American women singers
Singer-songwriters from California